Warm Spring Creek is an unincorporated community and census-designated place (CDP) in Fergus County, Montana, United States. It is near the geographic center of the county, on the west side of the Judith Mountains, in the valley of Warm Spring Creek, a west-flowing tributary of the Judith River.

The community was first listed as a CDP prior to the 2020 census.

Demographics

References 

Census-designated places in Fergus County, Montana
Census-designated places in Montana